Vigdis is a Norwegian film from 1943 directed by Helge Lunde. It is based on the novel Vigdis og hennes barns fedre (Vigdis and Her Child's Fathers), which was published by the lawyer Albert Wiesener in 1931 under the pseudonym Frantz Ferdinand.

Plot
Vigdis is the daughter of the teacher and fervent church singer Jens Bjørkeli. Vigdis is often at parties with other young people from the area, something her strict parents do not like. Their concern is not entirely unjustified because the residents of the area have started talking about their daughter in the town. Her parents try to get her to go to Christian meetings, but she always manages to evade this.

The parents suspect their maid Kari of helping Vigdis. Vigdis is in love with Dr. Victor Falck. However, she does not tell anyone about this because Falck is engaged to Gerda Storm. In the evening there is dancing, and Vigdis kisses Falck. A few days later there is a mission meeting, and Vigdis is there with her parents. A forest worker, Anton, stands outside drunk. However, Vigdis manages to follow him home. Nine months later, Vigdis gives birth to a son. Despite attempts at persuasion, Vigdis does not want to say who the child's father really was.

Cast

Eva Sletto as Vigdis Bjørkli
Lars Tvinde as Jens Bjørkli, a teacher and church singer
Liv Uchermann Selmer as Minda Bjørkli, his wife
Tulla Hauge as Kari, a servant girl at the Bjørkli home
Harald Heide Steen as Anders Moen, a forest worker
Fridtjof Mjøen as Victor Falck, a doctor
Bjørg Riiser-Larsen as Gerda Storm, Falck's fiancée
Henki Kolstad as Erik Borgan, an assistant clerk
Eva Strøm Aastorp as Berit Bråten, a farmer's daughter
Arvid Nilssen as Anton Stubberudstuen, a forest worker
Guri Stormoen as Olga Stubberudstuen
Joachim Holst-Jensen as P. P. Jeremiassen, a shoemaker
Øyvind Øyen as Harald Nordby, a wealthy farmer
Ragna Breda as Nordby's sister
Turid Haaland as Nordby's sister
Synnøve Øian as Nordby's girlfriend
Thomas Thomassen as the judge
Haakon Arnold	
Pehr Qværnstrøm as the witness
Oscar Egede-Nissen as a farm boy
Dagmar Myhrvold as the midwife
Lisbeth Nyborg as a farmer's wife
Vivi Schøyen as a barmaid
Edith Carlmar as a woman (not credited)

References

External links
 
 Vigdis at the National Library of Norway

1943 films
Norwegian black-and-white films
1940s Norwegian-language films